Proeulia tricornuta is a species of moth of the family Tortricidae. It is found in the Maule Region of Chile.

The wingspan is 22 mm. The ground colour of the forewings is cream with pale brownish ochreous suffusions and numerous blackish brown dots. The hindwings are cream, somewhat suffused with brownish on the periphery.

Etymology
The species name refers to the number of cornuti and is derived from Greek tres or tria (meaning three).

References

Moths described in 2010
Proeulia
Moths of South America
Taxa named by Józef Razowski
Endemic fauna of Chile